Cyperus guianensis is a species of sedge that is native to northern parts of South America.

See also
List of Cyperus species

References

guianensis
Plants described in 1936
Flora of Brazil
Flora of Suriname
Flora of Guyana
Taxa named by Georg Kükenthal